HPMPA is an experimental broad spectrum antiviral.

References

Antiviral drugs
Purines